Castle Mountain is a mountain on Morrissey Ridge in Fernie, British Columbia, Canada.

Castle Mountain is well known for bike trails.

See also
Coal Creek, British Columbia

References

External links
https://web.archive.org/web/20061011170334/http://fernie.com/maps/images/recreational_trail_map.pdf

Elk Valley (British Columbia)
Two-thousanders of British Columbia
Canadian Rockies
Kootenay Land District